The coastal plains of Chile are a series of discontinuous coastal plains found over much of Chile. Together with the Chilean Coast Range, the Chilean Central Valley and the Andes proper the coastal plains are one of the main landscape units of Chile.  In Coquimbo and Valparaíso regions these plains are of fluvial or marine origin, and sometimes of combined fluvial and marine origin.

See also
Coastal Cliff of northern Chile

References

Geography of Chile
Coasts of Chile
Plains of Chile